Kentucky Jones is an American comedy-drama television series starring Dennis Weaver which centers around a widowed Southern California veterinarian and rancher raising an adopted Chinese boy. Original episodes aired from September 19, 1964, until April 10, 1965.

Cast
Dennis Weaver....Kenneth Yarborough "Kentucky" Jones
Rickey Der....Dwight Eisenhower "Ike" Wong
Harry Morgan....Seldom Jackson
Keye Luke....Thomas Wong
Cherylene Lee....Annie Ng
Arthur Wong....Mr. Ng
Nancy Rennick....Edith Thorncroft

Synopsis

Dr. Kenneth Yarborough Jones is a veterinarian and former horse trainer in Southern California who owns a  horse ranch and has the nickname "Kentucky" because his signature is "K.Y. Jones" and "Ky" is the postal abbreviation for Kentucky (and "Kenneth" and "Kentucky" share the same first syllable). His wife had started the process for the couple to adopt and raise an orphaned nine-year-old — or 10-year-old, according to some sources — Chinese boy, but when she dies suddenly, Kentucky tries to stop the adoption process. He is too late, however, and the boy — named Dwight Eisenhower Wong and nicknamed "Ike," like former general and President Dwight Eisenhower — becomes his adopted son. Unexpectedly facing the challenge of raising Ike as a single father while continuing his veterinary practice and running his ranch, Kentucky is reluctant to bring Ike into his busy life at first, but he comes to love Ike. Helping him are his handyman, former jockey Seldom Jackson, as well as members of the local Chinese-American community. Edith Thorncroft is a social worker who visits to look in on Kentucky and Ike and check on Ike′s welfare. Annie Ng is Ike′s friend, and Mr. Ng is Annie's father.

Production

After nine seasons portraying Deputy Chester Goode on Gunsmoke, Dennis Weaver left Gunsmoke for Kentucky Jones. It was Weaver′s first starring role.

Kentucky Jones originally was produced without a laugh track, but after NBC threatened to cancel the show if it had no laugh track, its producers unwillingly added one.

Buzz Kulik created and produced Kentucky Jones. Vic Mizzy wrote the show′s theme music.

Critical reception

A review published in The New York Times on September 21, 1964, described Dennis Weaver as "not a performer of very extensive versatility," adding that in the role of Kentucky Jones he did "not [bring] much range of feeling or involvement." It credited Ricky Der with a sometimes-winning portrayal of Ike, but characterized Kentucky Jones as "mechanically constructed and far from well written," and the character of Ike as "exceptionally precocious."

Broadcast history

Kentucky Jones premiered on September 19, 1964, and aired on Saturdays at 8:30 p.m. through December 27, 1964. It moved to 8:00 p.m. on Saturdays — exchanging time slots with The Famous Adventures of Mr Magoo, which moved to 8:30 p.m. — on January 2, 1965, and remained there for the rest of its run. NBC cancelled it after only one season, and its last original episode aired on April 10, 1965.

NBC rebroadcast 22 of the 26 episodes of Kentucky Jones as prime-time reruns in the show′s regular time slot at 8:00 p.m. on Saturdays beginning on April 17, 1965, a week after it aired the last new episode. The last prime-time rerun aired on September 11, 1965. The following week, I Dream of Jeannie replaced Kentucky Jones in its time slot.

Home media
A three-disc boxed set of Kentucky Jones dubbed in German was released on Region 2 DVD on March 3, 2017. Twenty-one episodes of Kentucky Jones (episodes 1–8, 10–12, 14–16, 18–20, 22–24, and 26) dubbed in German were broadcast in West Germany beginning in September 1964, and the set includes them. The wording of reviews and promotional announcements does not make clear whether the other five episodes (9, 13, 17, 21, and 25), which were not dubbed in German, also are included in the DVD set, but implies that they are. The DVD set has no subtitle options, but includes the original trailer for the series, a short "trailer show," and a multi-page booklet with information about the show.

Episodes
Sources

References

External links
 Kentucky Jones opening credits on YouTube
 Scenes from Kentucky Jones on YouTube (dubbed in German)
 Vic Mizzy — Themes from The Addams Family and Kentucky Jones on YouTube

NBC original programming
1960s American comedy-drama television series
1964 American television series debuts
1965 American television series endings
Television shows set in California